Androcydes (also transliterated Androkydes) may refer to:

 Androcydes (painter), Greek painter, 4th century BC
 Androcydes (physician), Greek physician contemporary with Alexander the Great
 Androcydes (Pythagorean), author of the treatise On Pythagoric Symbols